Ekkara (before 1930: Κάτω Αγόριανη - Kato Agoriani) is a village and a community in the municipal unit Thessaliotida, Phthiotis, Greece. The population in 2011 was 576 for the village, and 691 for the community, which includes the village Ano Agoriani. Ekkara is situated at the southern end of the Thessalian Plain, near the border of the Karditsa regional unit. The Piraeus–Platy railway passes south of the village. Ekkara is located 2 km southeast of Gavrakia, 4 km west of Velesiotes, 10 km northwest of Domokos, 33 km southeast of Karditsa and 36 km northwest of Lamia. There are farmlands in the plains to the north, while there are some forests in the hills to the south. The majority of the population works in agriculture.

Historical population

External links
Ekkara on GTP Travel Pages (in English and Greek)

See also

List of settlements in Phthiotis

References

Populated places in Phthiotis